This page is a list of past and present notable Asian Mexicans.

This list does not include Lebanese Mexicans; see List of Lebanese people in Mexico.

Arts/architecture/design
 Alberto T. Arai- architect, theorist and writer
 Eduardo Auyón- artist and cultural promoter
 Helen Bickham- artist
 Alejandro Honda- painter, puppeteer (es)
 Leonel Maciel- artist; member of the Salón de la Plástica Mexicana
 Carlos Nakatani- artist
 Luis Nishizawa- painter
 Kiyoto Ota- sculptor
 Midori Suzuki - artist
 Shinzaburo Takeda- painter, printmaker and professor of art
 Ayako Tsuru- artist
 Romeo Villalva Tabuena- painter and printmaker
 Shino Watabe- artist

Business and industry
 Carlos Kasuga Osaka- businessman
 Juan Manuel Ley- businessman
 Rajagopal- expert in business and marketing at Tec de Monterrey
 Zhenli Ye Gon- businessman; alleged drug trafficker

Entertainment
 Bruce Chun- cinematographer
 Jocelyn Enriquez- singer and songwriter
 Federico Fong- musician and producer
 Ana Gabriel- singer
 Hiromi Hayakawa- singer and actress
 Lyn May- actress, exotic dancer
 Bárbara Mori- actress and model
 Kenya Mori- actress 
 Noé Murayama- actor
 Úrsula Murayama- actress
 Seki Sano - actor, stage director
 Kavka Shishido- drummer and vocalist
 Su Muy Key- actress, dancer
 Nancy Taira- actress
 Sachi Tamashiro- actress, voice actress 
 Beng Zeng- actor, comedian (es)

Fashion
 Issa Lish- model
 Mirra or Catarina de San Juan- the "China Poblana"

Literature
 Axel Didriksson Takayanagi- writer, professor at UNAM
 Babaji Singh- credited with translating the Guru Granth Sahib into Spanish

Military
 Isidoro Montes de Oca- fought in the Mexican War of Independence
 Ramón Fabié- fought in the Mexican War of Independence
 Luis Pinzón- fought in the Mexican War of Independence
 Francisco Mongoy- fought in the Mexican War of Independence
 Kingo Nonaka- Captain, combat medic, photographer

Politics
 René Ricardo Fujiwara Montelongo- politician affiliated with PANAL 
 Pedro Kumamoto- Independent politician
 Jesús Kumate Rodríguez - physician and former Secretary of Health
 Alejandro Gómez Maganda- former Governor of Guerrero
 Gilberto Antonio Hirata Chico- state deputy for Ensenada Municipality
 Miguel Ángel Osorio Chong- former Secretary of the Interior; former Governor of Hidalgo

Science
 Alejandro Higashi- linguist, academic investigator (es)
 Eizi Matuda- botanist
 Sanjaya Rajaram- agronomist
 Keiko Shirai Matsumoto- biochemist,  Universidad Autónoma Metropolitana professor (es)

Sports
 Patricia Castañeda Miyamoto- swimmer
 Jesús Alberto Chong- boxer
 Ayako Hamada- wrestler 
 Xóchitl Hamada- wrestler
 Pablo Larios Iwasaki- goalkeeper 
 Ernesto Carlos Kuk Lee- baseball player
 Dai-won Moon- martial artist
 Sugi Sito- wrestler

See also
 List of Mexicans

Footnotes

Asian Mexicans
 
Asian